José Heredia (born 21 February 1969) is a Cuban weightlifter. He competed in the men's light heavyweight event at the 1992 Summer Olympics.

References

1969 births
Living people
Cuban male weightlifters
Olympic weightlifters of Cuba
Weightlifters at the 1992 Summer Olympics
Central American and Caribbean Games medalists in weightlifting
Place of birth missing (living people)
20th-century Cuban people